{{Automatic taxobox
| taxon = Janula
| authority = Strand, 1932
| type_species = J. bicornis
| type_species_authority = (Thorell, 1881)
| subdivision_ranks = Species
| subdivision = 44, see text
| synonyms = *Monetoculus Wunderlich, 2008<ref name=Yosh2011>{{cite journal| last1=Yoshida| first1=H.| last2=Koh| first2=J. K. H.| year=2011| title=Phoroncidia, Janula and a new genus Brunepisinus (Araneae: Theridiidae) from Brunei| journal=Acta Arachnologica| volume=60| issue=2| page=79| doi=10.2476/asjaa.60.75}}</ref>
| synonyms_ref = 
}}Janula is a genus of comb-footed spiders that was first described by Embrik Strand in 1932. It is a senior synonym of Monetoculus.

Species
 it contains forty-four species, found in the Caribbean, South America, Asia, Panama, and Queensland:Janula aspus (Levi, 1964) – NicaraguaJanula batman Yoshida & Koh, 2011 – BorneoJanula bicornigera (Simon, 1894) – BrazilJanula bicornis (Thorell, 1881) (type) – Australia (Queensland)Janula bicruciata (Simon, 1895) – BrazilJanula bifrons (Thorell, 1895) – MyanmarJanula bizona Yoshida & Koh, 2011 – BorneoJanula bruneiensis Yoshida & Koh, 2011 – BorneoJanula bubalis Yoshida & Koh, 2011 – BorneoJanula chiapensis (Levi, 1955) – Mexico, Costa Rica (Cocos Is.)Janula colima (Levi, 1955) – Mexico to PanamaJanula crysus (Buckup & Marques, 1992) – BrazilJanula cuzco (Levi, 1967) – PeruJanula dominica (Levi, 1955) – HispaniolaJanula erythrophthalma (Simon, 1894) – Panama, Lesser Antilles to BoliviaJanula flores E. N. L. Rodrigues, 2022 – BrazilJanula itaqui E. N. L. Rodrigues, 2022 – BrazilJanula jimmyi (Chavari & Brescovit, 2014) – ColombiaJanula juarezi (Levi, 1955) – MexicoJanula luteolimbata (Thorell, 1898) – MyanmarJanula lutzenbergeri E. N. L. Rodrigues, 2022 – BrazilJanula malachina (Simon, 1895) – Peru, BrazilJanula mamiraua E. N. L. Rodrigues, 2022 – BrazilJanula manauara E. N. L. Rodrigues, 2022 – BrazilJanula marginata (Thorell, 1898) – MyanmarJanula modesta (Thorell, 1898) – MyanmarJanula moyobamba (Levi, 1964) – PeruJanula nadleri (Levi, 1955) – Bahama Is., JamaicaJanula nebulosa (Simon, 1895) – Panama, Bolivia, Brazil, ParaguayJanula ocreata (Simon, 1909) – VietnamJanula panamensis (Levi, 1955) – PanamaJanula parva (Wunderlich, 2008) – MalaysiaJanula picta (Simon, 1895) – SingaporeJanula pimenta E. N. L. Rodrigues, 2022 – BrazilJanula pyrus (Levi, 1964) – PanamaJanula salobrensis (Simon, 1895) – Venezuela, Trinidad, Guyana, BrazilJanula seguro E. N. L. Rodrigues, 2022 – BrazilJanula taprobanica (Simon, 1895) – Sri LankaJanula teresopolis (Levi, 1964) – BrazilJanula triangularis Yoshida & Koh, 2011 – Thailand, Singapore, Brunei (Borneo)Janula triocellata Yoshida & Koh, 2011 – BorneoJanula unitus (Levi, 1964) – Cuba, JamaicaJanula vaticus (Levi, 1964) – Costa Rica, PanamaJanula zurlus'' (Levi, 1964) – Venezuela

See also
 List of Theridiidae species

References

Araneomorphae genera
Spiders of Asia
Spiders of Australia
Spiders of South America
Taxa named by Embrik Strand
Theridiidae